Hugh Benedict Willmott FSA MCIfA (born 1972) is a British archaeologist and academic. He is a Senior Lecturer in the Department of Archaeology at the University of Sheffield. His research focuses on medieval England, with a particular interest in monastic archaeology.

Biography 
Willmott attended Durham University from 1991 to 1999, obtaining the degrees of BA, MA and PhD. He was an undergraduate at University College. On leaving university, he worked for a short period in commercial archaeology before being appointed a lecturer in archaeology at The University of Sheffield in 2004, where he was promoted to Senior Lecturer in 2010.

Research 
Willmott's research focuses on the archaeology of England between c. 600–1600 A.D. He has published on diverse topics such as glassmaking, dining, early ecclesiastical settlements and the Dissolution of the Monasteries.

He has also directed a number of notable excavations;

 Middle Saxon monastery and later medieval settlement at West Halton (2003–2009)
 The Cluniac house at Monk Bretton Priory (2010)
 The medieval hospital and cemetery at Thornton Abbey, which included a mass grave relating to the Black Death (2011–2016)
 7th-8th century AD ecclesiastical settlement at Little Carlton, (2015–2017)
 Late 5th-6th century AD Anglo-Saxon cemetery at Scremby (2017–2019)

Professional and public engagement 
In the past Willmott has served on the committees of The Finds Research Group, the Society for Post-Medieval Archaeology and The Royal Archaeological Institute. He is currently the chair of the Society for Church Archaeology and the archaeological advisor to the Diocese of Sheffield. He was elected a full member of the Chartered Institute for Archaeologists in 2002 and a fellow of the Society of Antiquaries of London in 2005. In 2017 Willmott was featured as one of the University of Sheffield's Inspirational Academics.

Publications

Books 

 The Dissolution of the Monasteries in England and Wales. (2020). 
 Glass from the Gnalić Wreck. (2006). 
 A History of English Glassmaking AD43-1800 (2005) 
 Consuming Passions: Dining from Antiquity to the Eighteenth Century (2005) 
 Early Post-Medieval Vessel Glass in England (2002)

Recent book chapters and papers 

 Rethinking Early Medieval Productive Sites: wealth trade and tradition at Little Carlton, East Lindsey.
 A Black Death mass grave at Thornton Abbey: the discovery and examination of a fourteenth-century rural catastrophe.
 Of saints, sows or smiths? Copper-brazed iron handbells in Early Medieval England.
 Glaziers and the removal, recycling, and replacement of windows during the Reformation in England.
 Medieval cooking, dining and drinking.
 Excavations at the Priory of St. Mary Magdalene of Lund, Monk Bretton.
 Saxon glass furnaces at Glastonbury Abbey.

References 

1972 births
Living people
British archaeologists
Alumni of University College, Durham
Academics of the University of Sheffield